Groove Street is an album by jazz organist Larry Young which was recorded in 1962 and released on the Prestige label.

Reception

The Allmusic site awarded the album 3 stars and stated "Nothing all that substantial occurs, but fans of Jimmy Smith will enjoy the similar style that Larry Young had at the time."

Track listing 
All compositions by Larry Young except as indicated
 "Groove Street" - 4:54   
 "I Found a New Baby" (Jack Palmer, Spencer Williams) - 5:25   
 "Sweet Lorraine" (Cliff Burwell, Mitchell Parish) - 9:24   
 "Gettin' into It" - 14:24   
 "Talkin' About J.C." - 5:56

Personnel 
Larry Young - organ 
Bill Leslie - tenor saxophone
Thornel Schwartz - guitar 
Jimmie Smith - drums

References 

Larry Young (musician) albums
1962 albums
Prestige Records albums
Albums recorded at Van Gelder Studio
Albums produced by Esmond Edwards